Advanced Land Observing Satellite-2 (ALOS-2), also called Daichi-2, is a  Japanese satellite launched in 2014. Although the predecessor ALOS satellite had featured 2 optical cameras in addition to 1.2 GHz (L-band) radar, ALOS-2 had optical cameras removed to simplify construction and reduce costs. The PALSAR-2 radar is a significant upgrade of the PALSAR radar, allowing higher-resolution (1 x 3 m per pixel) spotlight modes in addition to the 10 m resolution survey mode inherited from the ALOS spacecraft. Also, the SPAISE2 automatic ship identification system and the Compact Infra Red Camera (CIRC) will provide supplementary data about sea-going ships and provide early warnings of missile launches.

Launch 
ALOS-2 was launched from Tanegashima, Japan, on 24 May 2014 by a H-IIA rocket.

Mission 
The satellite contains a 1.2 GHz synthetic-aperture radar (SAR) sensor that is intended to be used for cartography, monitoring of naval traffic and disaster monitoring of Asia and the Pacific. JAXA initially hoped to be able to launch the successor to ALOS during 2011, but these plans were delayed until 2014 because of budget restrictions.

See also 

 2014 in spaceflight
 Advanced Land Observation Satellite (ALOS) – predecessor spacecraft

References

External links 
 
 ALOS-2 brochure
  by JAXA
  by JAXA
 Eoportal ALOS-2 page

Earth observation satellites of Japan
JAXA
Space synthetic aperture radar
2014 in Japan
Spacecraft launched by H-II rockets
Spacecraft launched in 2014